= Lord Monypenny =

Title in the Peerage of Scotland

Lord Monypenny was a title in the Peerage of Scotland, created in about 1464. It became extinct or dormant on the death of the second Lord.

== Lords Monypenny ==
- William Monypenny, 1st Lord Monypenny (died between 1485 and 1488)
- Alexander Monypenny, 2nd Lord Monypenny (died after 1508)
